Jack the Giant Killer is a 2013 American fantasy film produced by The Asylum and directed by Mark Atkins. A modern take of the fairy tales "Jack the Giant Killer" and "Jack and the Beanstalk", the film stars Ben Cross and Jane March. It is a mockbuster of Jack the Giant Slayer. It was released on DVD in the UK as The Giant Killer.

Plot

A man who appears crazy shows up at Jack's eighteenth birthday party claiming to have a gift from Jack's missing father, Newald Krutchens. The stranger, Jess Walters, tells Jack that he never forgets a promise. Jack's mother, Sharon, believes Jess is "clinically insane" and wants Jack to forget about the ordeal. After opening the gift and discovering it contains only beans, Jack tosses them into an empty field.

Discovering the beanstalk the next morning, Jack is trapped by a bean tendril, and carried up into the clouds to find a strange land. He is chased by a dinosaur-like monster and takes refuge in a nearby floating mechanical castle, which is revealed to be operated by his father. For Jack, his father has been missing since birth, but Newald swears he has only been gone a few days. He is surprised that his son is now a legal adult but accepts that it must be true. He further deduces that the following must be true: one day in this land is equivalent to one year on Earth. Newald is still only twenty-nine. Jack explains to his father that Jess gave him the beans, and Newald fondly recalls that his friend never forgets a promise. Jack then suggests they go back down the beanstalk together, but Newald points out that "only he who plants the bean can travel the stalk".

Jack and his father explore the Land of the Clouds and visit the mysterious sorceress Selina in hope of finding a solution to their problem. Newald confronts Selina as she is taking a bath in the middle of an empty room. Meanwhile, Jack's girlfriend Lisa plants another beanstalk to rescue Jack, but Selina uses this beanstalk to take the beasts down to Earth so she can become its ruler. It is eventually revealed that Selina's mother, Mildred, became a local legend for claiming her daughter was stolen by giants. Selina is coming to Earth to find her.

The British Army steps in (dressed in the uniforms of World War II soldiers). They declare the beanstalk as a public menace, but their military weapons - including rifles, tranquilizer bullets and rubber bullets - are ineffective against the beasts. Lisa, Newald and Jack drive the floating castle off the edge of the world and Newald admits that he has no idea what is going to happen. Luckily, the castle seems to be holding up quite well. The castle spins off the edge of the world and they land safely on a creature. General O'Shauncey has seen many things in his army career, but he exclaims that this "takes the biscuit". Meanwhile, Jess pretends to be the prime minister.

Newald nabs Selina's necklace as he believes it will stop her control over the giants. He cites the law that "they will become peaceful beasts of the fields". Unfortunately, the giants do not become peaceful beasts of the fields and become evil, attacking everyone in sight. Newald takes Selina into a car and introduces her to his friends. The driver is squashed by a giant.

The British Army defeats most of the monsters but one remains. Jess sacrifices himself to distract the beast with his motorcycle, and is tragically squashed underfoot. Jack saves the day in a mechanical metal suit and Selina hugs Newald, undecided about her plans for retribution.

Cast

Release
The film was released direct-to-video and on video-on-demand on March 12, 2013. In the tradition of The Asylum's catalog, Jack the Giant Killer is a mockbuster of the New Line Cinema/Legendary Pictures film Jack the Giant Slayer.

Reception
Influx Magazine rated it "D" and called it "pretty bad". Moira gave the movie one star, finding the movie to have a good premise and that the first half has some promise, but that the last part of the movie fails to live up to this.

References

External links
 
 

The Asylum films
Mockbuster films
2013 direct-to-video films
2010s fantasy adventure films
2013 independent films
2013 films
American fantasy adventure films
Films based on Jack and the Beanstalk
Films shot in Los Angeles
American independent films
Jack the Giant Killer
2010s exploitation films
Films directed by Mark Atkins
2010s English-language films
2010s American films